François Bazin may refer to:

 François Bazin (composer) (1816–1878), French opera composer
 François Bazin (sculptor) (1897–1956), French sculptor
 François Xavier Bazin (1824–1865), French archetier and master bow maker